Kajínek is a 2010 Czech action drama film directed by Petr Jákl. The film received an award at the Festival International du Film Policier de Liege 2011. The film is based on the story of Jiří Kajínek, who managed to escape from a strictly guarded prison in the Mírov fortress.

Cast
 Konstantin Lavronenko as Jiří Kajínek (voiced by Jan Šťastný)
 Tatiana Vilhelmová as JUDr. Klára Pokorová
 Bogusław Linda as Mr. Doležal (voiced by Jan Vondráček)
Vladimír Dlouhý as Novotný
 Michal Dlouhý as Lejčko
Ken Duken as Bukovský (voiced by Jaromír Nosek)
Václav Noid Bárta as Venca Křížek
Alice Bendová as Alice Křížková
 Werner Daehn as Perner
 Deana Horváthová as Judge
 Hynek Čermák as Prison Officer Pakosta
 Jana Krausová as Mrs. Doležalová
 Daniel Daden Svoboda as Commander of URNA

References

External links
 

2010 action drama films
2010 films
2010s Czech-language films
Czech action drama films
Czech crime drama films
Czech crime thriller films
Czech Lion Awards winners (films)
2010 directorial debut films
Czech films based on actual events